Lois Michele Young, (born 19 January 1951) is a Belizean diplomat who currently serves as the Permanent Representative of Belize to the United Nations.

Young graduated with a bachelor's degree in law from King's College London. She has been a member of the Bar Association of Belize since 1976, and was previously Head of Chambers at Lois Young Barrow and Co. From 1975 to 1976 she was a Public Prosecutor in the Office of Public Prosecutions, a Crown Counsel in the Ministry of the Attorney General, and a magistrate. She chaired the Belize Social Security Appeals Tribunal from 1989 to 2002 and chaired the Board of Directors of the Social Security Chamber from 2008.

See also
List of current Permanent Representatives to the United Nations

References

1951 births
Living people
Alumni of King's College London
Permanent Representatives of Belize to the United Nations
Place of birth missing (living people)
Belizean women diplomats
Women ambassadors